At the 1984 Winter Olympics eight cross-country skiing events – four each for men and women – were contested. The competitions were held from Thursday, 9 February, to Sunday, 19 February 1984. The women's 20 km debuted at these games.

Medal summary

Medal table

Participating NOCs
Thirty two nations sent cross-country skiers to compete in the events in Sarajevo.

Men's events

Women's events

See also
Cross-country skiing at the 1984 Winter Paralympics

References

External links
Official Olympic Report

 
1984 Winter Olympics
1984 Winter Olympics events
Olympics
Cross-country skiing competitions in Yugoslavia